Luis Alberto Albornoz Carreras (born 18 November 1908, date of death unknown) was a Peruvian sports shooter. He competed in the 300 metre rifle, three positions event at the 1960 Summer Olympics, finishing 33rd.

Albornoz also competed in team rifle events at the Pan American Games. He won two silvers and one bronze medal at the inaugural 1951 games in Buenos Aires, and one bronze at the 1959 games in Chicago, representing his native Peru.

References

External links
 

1908 births
Year of death missing
Peruvian male sport shooters
Olympic shooters of Peru
Shooters at the 1960 Summer Olympics
Sportspeople from Callao
Pan American Games medalists in shooting
Pan American Games bronze medalists for Peru
Shooters at the 1959 Pan American Games
Medalists at the 1951 Pan American Games
Medalists at the 1959 Pan American Games
20th-century Peruvian people